The brothers Gaspard (born 1624 or 1625, died 10 December 1681) and Balthazar Marsy (baptised 6 January 1628, died May 1674) were French sculptors. Originally from Cambrai, they moved to Paris and were employed by King Louis XIV, particularly for the decoration of the palace and gardens at Versailles.

Their sister Jeanne was married to the sculptor Pierre Le Gros the Elder and was the mother of the sculptor Pierre Le Gros the Younger.

Works

Bassin d'Encelade (Basin of Enceladus; 1675–1677), Versailles

References
 Gerhard Bissell, Marsy (family of sculptors), in: Allgemeines Künstlerlexikon (Artists of the World), Vol. 87, de Gruyter, Berlin 2015, from p. 308 (in German). 
Thomas Hedin, The Sculpture of Gaspard and Balthazard Marsy, Columbia (University of Missouri Press) 1983.
François Souchal, French Sculptors of the 17th and 18th Centuries: The Reign of Louis XIV., vol. III/IV 1987–1993.

External links
 

17th-century French sculptors
French male sculptors
1620s births
1674 deaths
1681 deaths
Sibling duos